KF Sopoti is an Albanian sports club based in Librazhd. The club currently competes in the Kategoria e Dytë, the third tier of football in Albania.

History
They were founded in 1948 under the name KS Albania Tabak Librazhd, and they play their home games at the Sopoti Stadium. The club is named after the nearby Sopot Mountain. They spent the 1992/93, 1993/94, 1995/96 and 1996/97 seasons in the Kategoria Superiore. Before the 1996/97 season, they changed their name back to Albania Tabak Librazhd, only to change it to Sopoti Librazhd once more the next year.

Stadium
The club's home ground is the multi-use Sopoti Stadium which is situated in the centre of the town next to the municipality building. The stadium which has a capacity of 3,000 spectators was built in 1964 and has been the club's home ever since. The stadium is not currently fit for use but the Albanian Football Association along with the Librazhd Municipality have drawn up initial plans to reconstruct the stadium in its entirety, but such plans have yet to be materialised due to a lack of funding.

As of the 2014–15 season, the stadium does not meet the current Albanian Football Association's standard requirements, due to the outdated and run down nature of the building as well as the field. In the 2017–18 season, Kf Sopoti will play in home stadium with new coach the 25 years old ex player of Sopoti Mr. Klajdi Kënga and the players will be from age groups .

Recent seasons

Current squad

 (Captain)

Historical list of coaches

 Kostika Sterja (1992-1994)
 Luan Deliu (1994-1997)
 Ylli Hasa (1997-1998)
 Gentian Stojku (Aug 2014 - Mar 2015)
 Edmond Dalipi (Mar 2015 - May 2015)
 Alpin Gallo (Aug 2016 - Oct 2016)
 Bekim Kuli (Mar 2017 - Jun 2017)
 Klajdi Kënga (Aug 2017 – )

References

External links
FutbolliShqiptar.net
Albanian Soccer News

Football clubs in Albania
Association football clubs established in 1948
1948 establishments in Albania
Librazhd
Kategoria e Dytë clubs